Swaminarayan, the founder of the Swaminarayan Sampraday, established temples, known as mandirs (Devnagari: मन्दिर), as part of his philosophy of theism and deity worship. These mandirs are known as Swaminarayan Hindu temples.

He constructed nine temples in the following cities; Ahmedabad, Bhuj, Muli, Vadtal, Junagadh, Dholera, Dholka, Gadhpur & Jetalpur. In these temples he installed images of various Hindu gods, such as NarNarayan Dev, LaxmiNarayan Dev, RadhaKrishna Dev, RadhaRaman Dev, Revti-Baldevji, Madan Mohan Dev etc. Each of these nine original temples fall either under the NarNarayan Dev Gadi, Ahmedabad or the LaxmiNarayan Dev Gadi, Vadtal depending on their geographical location.

One of the most prominent features of the heritage of Swaminarayan is temple architecture. The images in the temples built by Swaminarayan are the evidence of the priority of Krishna. All of the temples constructed during his life show some form of Krishna, and all temples since have such worshipable murtis. In the temples of the dioceses of Ahmedabad and Vadtal, they are predominantly a central altar or a shrine. Human forms are predominant but for a known exception of a Hanuman temple at Sarangpur, where Hanuman is the central figure. The temples have accommodations for sadhus built next to them. Stones were quarried in far places and carried to the temple sites.

Swaminarayan temples, like other Hindu temples, have walkways around the central shrine to allow worshipers to circumambulate the shrine. These are often decorated with designs and inlaid marble. The main shrine area is divided by railings. One side of the railing is reserved for women, as Swaminarayan propagated that men and women should be separated in temples to allow full concentration on god. Men do a specified number of prostrations (as decided by themselves). In front of the men's section, there is a small section reserved for ascetics and special guests. There is great variety in form and nature of the central images, in front of which are gold- or silver-plated doors that open during darshan.

Today there are over a thousand Swaminarayan temples, spread across five continents, which come under the above two Gadis (seats) of the Swaminarayan Sampraday.

Temples 

As an adjunct to the scriptures in establishing ultimate redemption and consolidating the framework of the holy fellowship (Satsang), Swaminarayan constructed stone mandirs, buttressing Upasana – worshipping God, and devotion towards the deities. Towards the end of his second decade of work, he placed a greater emphasis on devotion than detachment – vairagya to foster love for God. This emphasis on devotion culminated in the building of mandirs, which served as permanent places of worship, centres for religious gathering, instruction, the study of Sanskrit, devotional music and Vedic literature, and as centres of social services where alms, medicines and clothes were available to the poor and needy. In a span of six years, from 1822 till 1828, Swaminarayan sanctioned the construction of nine mandirs in Gujarat: Ahmedabad, Mooli, Bhuj, Vadtal, Jetalpur, Dholera, Dholka, Junagadh and Gadhada.

One of the most prominent features of the heritage of Swaminarayan is its temple architecture. The images in the temples built by Swaminarayan are the evidence of the priority of Krishna. All of the temples constructed during his life show some form of Krishna, and all temples since have such worshipable figures, or murtis. In the temples of the dioceses of Ahmedabad and Vadtal, these are predominantly a central altar or a shrine. Human forms are predominant, with the exception of the Hanuman temple at Sarangpur, where Hanuman is the central figure. The temples have accommodation for ascetics built next to them. Stones were quarried in far places and carried to the temple sites.

Swaminarayan temples, like other Hindu temples, have walkways around the central shrine to allow worshipers to circumambulate the shrine, which is often decorated with designs and inlaid marble. The main shrine area is divided by railings. One side of the railing is reserved for women, as Swaminarayan said that men and women should be separated in temples to allow full concentration on god. Men perform a specified number of prostrations. In front of the men's section, there is normally a small area reserved for ascetics and special guests. There is great variety in the form and nature of the central images, in front of which are gold- or silver-plated doors that open during darshan. Swaminarayan ordered the construction of the following six mandirs and installed the images of various deities, such as Nara Narayana, Laxminarayan, Radha Krishna, Radha Ramana, Revti Baldevji, himself.

Temples in India

Shri Swaminarayan Mandir, Ahmedabad 

Shri Swaminarayan Mandir is the first temple Swaminarayan constructed. It was built in Ahmedabad in 1822, and presents images of Nara Narayana, who occupies the principal seat of the temple, and forms of Arjuna and Krishna at the central altar. The left altar has murtis of Radha Krishna. The land for construction of the temple was donated by the East India Company government of the day. The task of constructing it was entrusted by Swaminarayan to Ananandand Swami. The temple is constructed as per scriptural norms with intricate carving in Burma teak and sculptural art depicting deities' episodes, auspicious symbols and religious icons representing axiomatic religion and Indian culture. The temple is believed to be a valuable cultural heritage in the socio-religious history of Gujarat and India. The installation ceremony of the murti forms in the temple was celebrated in the presence of thousands of pilgrims from across India. Nara Narayana .

Shri Swaminarayan Mandir, Bhuj 

On the request of devotees from Bhuj, Swaminarayan asked Vaishnavananand Swami to go there with a team of saints and build a temple. In 1822, they camped on land adjacent to the temple site and drew plans of the temple complex. within a year they had built a temple abode of Nar Narayan. The Gujarat earthquake on 26 January 2001 destroyed much of the city of Bhuj, including this temple. Members of the Swaminarayan Sampraday, including saints and satsangis of Kutch residing in India and abroad, have resolved to construct a new marble temple a short distance from the site. The new temple, the largest in Gujarat, was opened in May 2010 by the then Chief Minister of Gujarat, Narendra Modi.

Shri Swaminarayan Mandir, Vadtal 

The temple in Vadtal, also known as Vadtal Swaminarayan, is in the shape of a lotus, with nine domes in the inner temple. The land for this shrine was donated by Joban Pagi, a dacoit who was later converted into a devotee by Swaminarayan. The temple was constructed under the supervision of Brahmanand Swami, was completed within fifteen months and the idols of Laxmi Narayan was installed by Swaminarayan on 3 November 1824, amidst chants of vedic hymns and devotional fervour of the installation ceremony. Swaminarayan also installed his own idol in Vadtal, naming it Harikrishna Maharaj. The walls are decorated with colourful representations from the Ramayana. The temple's walls are decorated with colourful representations from the Ramayana.

Shri Swaminarayan Mandir, Dholera 

Dholera is an ancient port-city,  from Dhandhuka in Ahmedabad District. This temple has three domes. Its construction was supervised and planned by Nishkulanand Swami, Bhai Atmanand Swami, Akshardanand Swami and Dharmprasad Swami. The land for the temple was donated by Darbar Punjabhai. On 19 May 1826, Swaminarayan installed the idols of Madan Mohan and his own form Harikrishna, at the principal seat of the temple and invoked Gods amidst Vedic hymns.

Shri Swaminarayan Mandir, Junagadh 

This temple, in the city of Junagadh on Mount Girnar, has five domes and external decoration with sculptures. Its construction was supervised by Brahmanand Swami; it was built on land donated by king Hemantsinh of Jinabhai, Darbar of Panchala. The life of Swaminarayan is crafted in stone on the dome of the sanctum.

Shri Swaminarayan Mandir, Gadhada 

The land for the temple in Gadhada (or Gadhpur) was donated by the court of Dada Khachar in Gadhada. Darbar Dada Khachar and his family were devotees of Swaminarayan. The temple was made built the courtyard of his own residence. This shrine has two stories and three domes and is adorned with carvings. Swaminarayan assisted in the construction of the temple by lifting stones and mortar, and he installed the figures of Gopinath, Radhika and Harikrishna on 9 October 1828.

Gadhada is also home to Laxmi Vadi. This is the burial place of Swaminarayan's ashes. The site is marked by a shrine consisting of the idols of brother Ichharam, Swaminarayan himself and Raghuvirji Maharaj.

Other temples 
Sahajanand Swami also ordered construction of temples at Muli, Dholka and Jetalpur. Although these temples were completed after his death, the Murti pratishtas, idol installation ceremonies, were conducted by Sahajanand Swami. He installed images of various manifestations of God, such as Nar Narayan Dev, Laxmi Narayan Dev, Radha Krishna, Radha Raman and Revti Baldevji. Swaminarayan lived in Gadhpur for about 27 years; he stayed at the Darbar of Dada Khachar, one of his best-known devotees. At some temples, footprints of Swaminarayan are worshiped by his followers. Swaminarayan entrusted the day-to-day performance of the worship rituals in these mandirs to ascetics. By 2012, there were over a thousand Swaminarayan temples across five continents.

Overseas 

In the 1920s, members of the sect began to move out of India to East Africa in search of work and better lives. Among these was a large number of Kutchis of the Leva Patel/Patidar community, who remained to the Bhuj temple under the Nar Nararayan Dev Gadi. All the temples built in Africa come under the temple in Bhuj. The first Swaminarayan temple in Africa was built in Nairobi in 1945, and temples were built in Mombasa and other Kenyan towns in the following years. Temples were also built in Tanzania and Uganda. The Swaminarayan temple in Karachi, Pakistan, was built in 1868 when Karachi was part of the Indian Union.

After the Second World War, members of the movement in East Africa began migrating to the United Kingdom; the number of migrants rose significantly in the 1960s and 1970s. The first Swaminarayan temple in the UK was built in Bolton in 1973. This was followed by a temple in the London suburb of Willesden, which was consecrated in 1975 and is the sect's biggest temple in the UK. Temples have been built in other parts of the UK, such as Cardiff, Oldham, Leicester and Brighton and several others in London. The temple in Leicester was opened in 1993 and was the first in Europe under the International Swaminarayan Satsang Organisation (ISSO) and was followed by one in Sweden.

A small number of followers migrated to the United States before 1965 as students, and following a 1965 immigration law, a large number of Indians, including members of the sect. moved there from the 1970s until 2000. The ISSO was formed in 1978 in Chicago under the Nar Narayan Dev Gadi. The temple in Weehawken, New Jersey, was opened in 1987, and was the first in the US. By 2012, the organisation had 20 temples in the US, in cities including Boston, Houston, Chicago, Los Angeles, Tampa, Florida, Detroit and Cleveland, Ohio, Colonia, Parsippany and Cherry Hill. Another organisation, International Swaminarayan Satsang Mandal (ISSM), under the Laxmi Narayan Dev Gadi, has temples in Chicago, Grand Prairie, Texas, Sunnyvale, California, Downey and Somerset, New Jersey. Also under the Laxmi Narayan Dev Gadi, the Laxminarayan Dev Spiritual Organisation (LDSO) has been set up in San Francisco to promote the faith there. http://www.swaminarayanvadtalgadi.org/temples/temple-international/

The movement also has temples in Australia, Seychelles, Canada, Thailand, Fiji, Mauritius, New Zealand, Oman, UAE and Zambia.

Australia

New South Wales

Victoria

Western Australia

Queensland

South Australia

Canada

Ontario

Fiji

India

Delhi

Telangana

West Bengal

Gujarat

Gujarat Origin Place of Swaminarayan Sampraday

Karnataka

Madhya Pradesh

Jabalpur

Maharashtra

Rajasthan

Tamil Nadu

Uttarakhand

Uttar Pradesh

Kenya

Central Province

Coast Province

Nairobi Province

Nyanza Province

Rift Valley Province

Mauritius 

{| class="wikitable plain" border="0" width="800"
|- 
| width="220px" rowspan="2" style="border:none;" | 
| valign="top" colspan=2 style="border:none;" |Shri Swaminarayan Mandir, Terre Rough, Mauritius
|-
| valign="top" style="text-align:right; border:none;" | Location:Deity:Constructed in:Architecture:Notes:| valign="top" style="border:none;" | 1st Floor, Kurjibhai Ramjibhai Building Le Hochet, Terre Rough Mauritius Tel: +230 2493656. Fax: +230 2481481Lord Swaminarayan – – This Mandir comes under the NarNarayan Dev Gadi
|}

 New Zealand 

Oman

 Pakistan 

Sindh

 Seychelles 

 Sweden 

 Tanzania 

Arusha Region

Dar-es-Salaam Region

Kilimanjaro Region

 Thailand 

UAE

 Uganda 

 United Kingdom 

East Midlands

London

North West England

South East England

Wales

West Midlands

 United States 

Alabama

California

Connecticut

District of Columbia

Florida

Georgia

Illinois

Kansas

Maryland

Massachusetts

Michigan

Missouri

Mississippi

New Jersey

New York

North Carolina

Ohio

Pennsylvania

Texas

Zambia

Notes

 References 
 

 
 List of Mandirs Worldwide

Further reading
 Barot, R., "Religion, Migration and Wealth Creation in the Swaminarayan Movement", The Transnational Family: New European Frontiers and Global Networks, Berg Publishers, 2002.
 Williams, Raymond Brady, A New Face of Hinduism: The Swaminarayan Religion, Cambridge University Press, 1984
 Nesbitt, E., "Locating British Hindus' sacred space", Contemporary South Asia, 15(2) p. 195–208. Routledge, 2006.

 Official websites of the Swaminarayan Sampraday 

 Shri Narnarayan Dev Gadi website
 Shri Laxminarayan Dev Gadi website
 Bhuj Mandir website
 Shree swaminarayan Mandir Sardhar
 Shree Swaminarayan Temples Kundal And Karelibag'''

Swaminarayan temples